Lieutenant General (Dr.) Paul Kendall Carlton Jr. (born May 13, 1947) was the 17th Surgeon General of the United States Air Force, Headquarters U.S. Air Force, Bolling Air Force Base, D.C.

General Carlton was commissioned after being honored a distinguished graduate of the United States Air Force Academy in 1969. He is a fellow and former Air Force governor of the American College of Surgeons. He was named a consultant in general surgery to the Air Force surgeon general in 1981. He conceptualized and implemented the first Air Force rapid-response surgical team in Europe—the flying ambulance surgical trauma team. He remains an active surgeon having performed more than 4,000 operations as principal surgeon and 6,000 as first assistant. He has published extensively in medical literature.

An active flier, General Carlton holds Federal Aviation Administration commercial, instrument, multi-engine, glider and instructor ratings. During Operation Desert Storm, he commanded the 1702nd Air Refueling Wing Contingency Hospital, completing 32 combat support missions and 140 combat flying hours in the C-21, C-130, KC-10 and KC-135. He retired from the Air Force December 1, 2002.

After retiring from the Air Force, General Carlton was named Director of the Homeland Security Initiative for the Texas A&M Health Science Center to address homeland security issues related to human health.

General Carlton is the managing member of PK Concepts, LLC.

Education
1969 Bachelor of science degree, U.S. Air Force Academy, Colorado Springs, Colorado
1973 Doctor of medicine, University of Colorado at Denver

Assignments
September 1969 – May 1973, medical student, University of Colorado, Denver
July 1973 – June 1978, resident, general surgery, Wilford Hall USAF Medical Center, Lackland Air Force Base, Texas
June 1978 – April 1979, staff surgeon, Royal Air Force Lakenheath, England
April 1979 – May 1982, Chief, General Surgery, USAF Hospital, Luke Air Force Base, Arizona
May 1982 – August 1985, Chairman, Department of Surgery, USAF Regional Medical Center, Wiesbaden Air Base, West Germany
August 1985 – May 1988, Commander, USAF Hospital, Torrejon Air Base, Spain
May 1988 – August 1991, Commander, USAF Medical Center, Scott Air Force Base, Illinois (October 1990 – March 1991, Commander, 1702nd Air Refueling Wing Contingency Hospital, Southwest Asia)
August 1991 – September 1994, Director, Medical Services and Training, Headquarters Air Education and Training Command, Randolph Air Force Base, Texas
September 1994 – May 1999, Commander, 59th Medical Wing, Wilford Hall USAF Medical Center, Lackland Air Force Base, Texas
May 1999 – November 1999, Commander and Director, Air Force Medical Operations Agency, Office of the Surgeon General, Bolling Air Force Base, D.C.
December 1999 – October 2002, The Surgeon General of the Air Force, Headquarters U.S. Air Force, the Pentagon, Bolling Air Force Base, D.C.

Major awards and decoration

Airman's Medal

Citation:
Lieutenant General Paul K. Carlton, Jr. distinguished himself by heroism involving voluntary risk of life at the Pentagon, Washington, District of Columbia on 11 September 2001. On that date, an American Airlines 757 with 67 passengers originating at Dulles Airport crashed into the Pentagon near the heliport. The approximate number of casualties at point of impact was 190. General Carlton was in the Pentagon at the time of the crash. Knowing that there would be numerous casualties, he proceeded to Corridor 4, C ring. General Carlton entered a room filled with chest high debris. Although half the room was engulfed in flames and smoke filled, General Carlton and several other rescuers located a trapped victim who was stuck under some fallen debris. The men could see the trapped victim but could not quite reach the man. One of the rescuers cleared the debris while General Carlton tried to pull the victim free. He then placed a water-soaked tee shirt on the victim's face to aid his breathing. The victim was roused, and realizing the imminent danger they were all facing, rolled to his left far enough for General Carlton to grab him. They were then able to move the victim to safety. All the while, the room continued to rain fire and debris on General Carlton and the others. As the fire intensified and moved closer in the room, General Carlton continued to sweep the room for other victims. There was a loud noise; the flaming ceiling began to fall and one of the rescuers shouted for all to leave the area. As the metal caging in the ceiling gave way, General Carlton helped the others to escape the burning room. The exemplary courage and heroism displayed by General Carlton reflect great credit upon himself and the United States Air Force.

Commendations
Lt Gen Carlton has been awarded the following:

Effective dates of promotion

External links
 Medical Response to 9/11
 Improved Health and Health Facility Design in Africa
 Three Star General Advocates Modular ConstructionSenate Hearing on Reforming the Indian Health Care System. Testimony of General Paul K. Carlton Jr. (Retired), MD, FACS

References

Surgeons General of the United States Air Force
Recipients of the Air Force Distinguished Service Medal
Recipients of the Legion of Merit
Recipients of the Airman's Medal
United States Air Force Academy alumni
Recipients of the Air Medal
Living people
1946 births
University of Colorado Denver alumni